Wormleysburg is a borough in Cumberland County, Pennsylvania, United States. The population was 3,070 at the 2010 census. It is part of the Harrisburg–Carlisle Metropolitan Statistical Area.

Wormleysburg is served by West Shore School District. The borough is home to Harsco Corporation.

History
The community was named for founder John Wormley and was incorporated as a borough in May 1916 from East Pennsboro Township.

The John Wormley House was added to the National Register of Historic Places in 1976.

Geography
Wormleysburg is located on the eastern border of Cumberland County at  (40.258689, -76.905954). It is situated on the west bank of the Susquehanna River across from Harrisburg, the state capital. It is bordered to the north and west by East Pennsboro Township and to the south by the borough of Lemoyne. U.S. Routes 11 and 15 pass through the borough together, leading north  to Exit 65 on Interstate 81 and southwest  through Camp Hill to the Capital Beltway (Pennsylvania Route 581). The M. Harvey Taylor Memorial Bridge and Market Street Bridge cross the Susquehanna from Wormleysburg into Harrisburg.

Demographics

As of the census of 2000, there were 2,607 people, 1,295 households, and 663 families residing in the borough. The racial makeup of the borough was 92.14% White, 1.30% African American, 0.15% Native American, 4.22% Asian, 0.04% Pacific Islander, 0.31% from other races, and 1.84% from two or more races. Hispanic or Latino of any race were 1.34% of the population.

There were 1,295 households, out of which 19.4% had children under the age of 18 living with them, 40.2% were married couples living together, 8.7% had a female householder with no husband present, and 48.8% were non-families. 39.9% of all households were made up of individuals, and 10.4% had someone living alone who was 65 years of age or older. The average household size was 2.01 and the average family size was 2.71.

In the borough the population was spread out, with 17.7% under the age of 18, 8.7% from 18 to 24, 32.6% from 25 to 44, 25.1% from 45 to 64, and 16.0% who were 65 years of age or older. The median age was 38 years. For every 100 females, there were 96.5 males. For every 100 females age 18 and over, there were 95.1 males.

The median income for a household in the borough was $40,536, and the median income for a family was $49,342. Males had a median income of $36,250 versus $27,902 for females. The per capita income for the borough was $28,504. About 3.6% of families and 5.2% of the population were below the poverty line, including 8.2% of those under age 18 and 1.5% of those age 65 or over.

References

External links

Borough of Wormleysburg official website

Pennsylvania populated places on the Susquehanna River
Populated places established in 1772
Harrisburg–Carlisle metropolitan statistical area
Boroughs in Cumberland County, Pennsylvania
1815 establishments in Pennsylvania